The Surabaya Synagogue was a synagogue in Surabaya, Indonesia. The synagogue was built in 1948, located at Jl. Kayon 4–6. For decades, the old Indies style-building was the only synagogue in Indonesia that ever existed. In 2013, the owner sold the land, the synagogue was demolished, and it replaced by 17-story highrise hotel.

Cultural landmark status 
In 2009, the synagogue was actually planned by Surabaya Department of City Culture and Tourism as one of the cultural landmark (Bangunan Cagar Budaya) in Surabaya (646/1654/436.6.14/2009). Ironically, before the building was officially designated as cultural landmark by the Surabaya City Government, the real estate developer demolished the building without notice.

Demolition 
In 2013, there were protests from Islamic organizations in front of the Surabaya Synagogue due to Gaza-Israel conflict. The protesters also sealed the building and prompted to Surabaya City Government not to designate the synagogue as official cultural landmark. Because of years without landmark designation, a real estate developer demolished the building. Jewish people in Surabaya reported the action to the Surabaya Police Department, but there was no clear response from the police. Since 2018, the site is replaced by 17-story hotel.

See also 
History of the Jews in Indonesia
Israelitische Gemeente Soerabaia

References

External links 
The Museum of the Jewish People at Beit Hatfutsot : The Synagogue of Surabaya
The Jews of Surabaya

Buildings and structures in Surabaya
Jews and Judaism in Indonesia
Synagogues in Indonesia
Iraqi-Jewish diaspora
Iraqi-Jewish diaspora in Asia